Peter Herresthal is a Norwegian violinist and Professor at the Norwegian Academy of Music in Oslo and Visiting Professor at Royal College of Music in London. He won the Spellemannprisen in 2002.

References

Year of birth missing (living people)
Living people
Norwegian violinists
Male violinists
Academic staff of the Norwegian Academy of Music
Academics of the Royal College of Music
21st-century violinists
21st-century Norwegian male musicians